The U.S. Sugar program is the federal commodity support program that maintains a minimum price for sugar, authorized by the 2002 farm bill (P.L. 107–171, Sec. 1401–1403) to cover the 2002-2007 crops of sugar beets and sugarcane.

Originally designed to protect the incomes of the sugar industry-growers of sugarcane and sugar beets, and firms that process each crop into sugar - the program now prevents them from competing with producers of corn syrup sweetener. It supports domestic sugar prices by:
(1) making available nonrecourse loans to processors (not less than 18¢/lb. for raw cane sugar, or 22.9¢/lb. for refined beet sugar);
(2) restricting sugar imports using a tariff rate quota, and
(3) limiting the amount of sugar that processors can sell domestically (under marketing allotments) when imports are below 1.532 million short tons.

Import restrictions are intended to meet U.S. commitments under the North American Free Trade Agreement (NAFTA) and Uruguay Round Agreement on Agriculture. Processor and refiner marketing allotments are set by USDA according to statutory requirements. Marketing allotments and new payment-in-kind authority are designed to help the USDA meet the no-cost-requirements to the federal government by avoiding the forfeiture of sugar put under loan. Other parts of the new program can include a storage loan program for sugar processors, and reduced (by 1%) the USDA interest rate charged on sugar loans.

References

Further reading 
 U.S. Sugar Program Fundamentals Congressional Research Service

American sugar industry
United States Department of Agriculture
History of sugar